Millionaires for One Day (French: Millionnaires d'un jour) is a 1949 French comedy film directed by André Hunebelle and starring Gaby Morlay, Jean Brochard and Ginette Leclerc. It was shot at the Francoeur Studios in Paris. The film's sets were designed by the art director Lucien Carré. It was produced and distributed by Pathé.

Synopsis
Due to an error printed in a newspaper, a number of people wrongly believe they have won the lottery. When the mistake is revealed, it transpires that they are all better off anyway.

Cast 
 Gaby Morlay as  Hélène Berger, Pierre's wife
 Jean Brochard as  Pierre Berger, Hélène's husband
 Ginette Leclerc as Greta Schmidt
 Pierre Brasseur as Francis, the gangster
 Yves Deniaud as 	Antoine Bergas
 André Valmy as Marcel, an accomplice of Francis
 André Gabriello as Le maire de Villeneuve 
 Bernard Lajarrige as  Philippe Dubreuil, journalist
 Pierre Larquey as Jules Martin
 Louis de Funès as  Philippe's advocate
 Edmond Ardisson as Le directeur 
 Antoine Balpêtré as Toubib 
 Jacques Baumer as The Judge
 Léon Belières as 	Jules Flamand
 Paul Demange as Le collègue de Pierre Berger
 Pierre Destailles as Le cafetier
 Jeanne Fusier-Gir as Louise
 Max Révol as Jules, 
 Madeleine Barbulée as L'infirmière
 Georges Bréhat as Un avocat 
 Lucien Callamand as Le ministre
 Monique Darbaud as Sylvie Dubreuil
 Jacques Dynam as Michel
 Sylvie Pelayo as Sylvia
 Germaine Reuver as La vendeuse
Robert Noël as Un complice

References

Bibliography
 Bonnotte, Stéphane. Louis de Funès: jusqu'au bout du rire. Lafon, 2002.
Kermabon, Jacques. Pathé: premier empire du cinéma. Centre Georges Pompidou, 1994.

External links 
 

French comedy films
1940s French-language films
French black-and-white films
Films directed by André Hunebelle
1949 comedy films
1949 films
1940s French films
 Pathé films
Films shot at Francoeur Studios